P2Y purinoceptor 11 is a protein that in humans is encoded by the P2RY11 gene.

The product of this gene, P2Y11, belongs to the family of G-protein coupled receptors. This family has several receptor subtypes with different pharmacological selectivity, which overlaps in some cases, for various adenosine and uridine nucleotides. This receptor is coupled to the stimulation of the phosphoinositide and adenylyl cyclase pathways and behaves as a selective purinoceptor. Naturally occurring read-through transcripts, resulting from intergenic splicing between this gene and an immediately upstream gene (PPAN, encoding peter pan homolog), have been found. The PPAN-P2RY11 read-through mRNA is ubiquitously expressed and encodes a fusion protein that shares identity with each individual gene product.

See also
 P2Y receptor

References

Further reading

External links

G protein-coupled receptors